Jonathan Roberts (August 16, 1771July 24, 1854) was an American politician who served as a United States representative and Senator from Pennsylvania from 1811 to 1814 and 1814 to 1821 respectively. He was a member of the Democratic-Republican Party.

Life and career

Roberts was born near Norristown in the Province of Pennsylvania and was educated by a private tutor.  He later worked as a wheelwright apprentice.  From 1799 to 1800 Roberts served as a member of the Pennsylvania House of Representatives, and the Pennsylvania State Senate from 1807 to 1811.

On March 4, 1811, he began his tenure as a United States representative from Pennsylvania's 2nd congressional district, having been elected as a Democratic-Republican.  Working through the 12th and 13th United States Congresses he resigned on February 24, 1814, having been elected to the United States Senate to replace Michael Leib, who himself had resigned.  He started his service in the Senate on the same day.

Re-elected to a full term later in 1814, Roberts was the chairman of the Committee on Claims from the 14th through to the 16th Congress inclusive.  During the 16th he was also on the Committee to Audit and Control the Contingent Expenses and the Committee on Public Buildings.  He left the Senate on March 4, 1821.

From 1823 to 1826 he was again a member of the Pennsylvania House of Representatives, and later became the collector of customs at the port of Philadelphia from 1841 to 1842.  In 1848, Roberts built a school in Upper Merion for poor children who had to walk some distance from mill workers' houses to their previous school.

He died at the age of 82 on his farm, Robertsville, in King of Prussia, and was interred in the Roberts family cemetery In Upper Merion township, near Norristown, Montgomery County, Pennsylvania.

Footnotes

Sources
 

1771 births
1854 deaths
Members of the Pennsylvania House of Representatives
Pennsylvania state senators
People from Upper Merion Township, Pennsylvania
United States senators from Pennsylvania
Democratic-Republican Party United States senators
Democratic-Republican Party members of the United States House of Representatives from Pennsylvania